Ullu is an Over-The-Top media streaming platform, owned and maintained by Vibhu Agarwal, founder and group CEO of Ullu and Atrangii. It is currently available for Android and iOS.

Shows

Web series

Short films

References

External links

Companies based in Mumbai
Indian brands
Streaming media systems
Video on demand services
Indian entertainment websites
Indian web series
Indian pornography
2018 establishments in Maharashtra
Indian companies established in 2018
Mass media companies established in 2018